Salvat is a common given name and surname. It may refer to:

People
Given name
Salvat Etchart (1924-1985), French writer

Middle name
Joaquim Salvat Besora (born 1980), Spanish-born Andorran international footballer and former futsal player
Manuel Salvat Dalmau (1925-2012), Spanish publisher

Surname
André Salvat (1920-2017), French military colonel
Enrique Salvat (born 1950), Cuban fencer
Frank Salvat (1934–2013), British athlete Olympian and runner
Joan Salvat-Papasseit (1894-1924), Catalan poet
Josef Salvat, Australian singer-songwriter
Julienne Salvat (1932–2019), French teacher, poet, femme de lettres, actress
Sebastián Salvat (born 1967), Argentine rugby union player

Others
Enciclopedia Salvat, Spanish-language encyclopedia